Romer Mountain is a mountain located in the Catskill Mountains of New York south of Phoenicia. Sheridan Mountain is located north, and Cross Mountain is located south of Romer Mountain.

References

Mountains of Ulster County, New York
Mountains of New York (state)